Each year the perpetual "Arlington Million Trophy" is presented to the winners of the Arlington Million in a national televised award ceremony. The Arlington Million Trophy is one that was commissioned in 1984 and stays on display at Arlington Park in Arlington Heights, Illinois year round. Arlington Park is owned by Churchill Downs Incorporated and the parent company lists the Arlington Million as one of the country's most important races behind the Kentucky Derby and the Kentucky Oaks. The names of the horse and the connections are included in the display.

Dimensions of the trophy 
The trophy itself is a work of art. It is made of solid polished silver and 14 karat gold. The base is two platforms that make the foundation of the trophy. Both platforms are made of silver. The base is supporting eight  Greek revival silver columns. Inside the collar are  14 karat gold letters that spell the words Arlington Million. The bowl is Etched with the words Arlington Million in the shape of an arch. Inside the arch is a  14 karat gold relief of the Arlington Park emblem with two horses and a coat of arms. In time this emblem would become the facility's logo and used on marketing pieces for the track.

Owners, trainers and jockeys trophies 
Although the pertpetual trophy is only used in the ceremony, a 60% solid silver only replica is given to the winning owner each year. It is supported by six Greek revival columns. The winning trainer and jockey also receive trophies but these do not resemble the perpetual trophy.

Traditions 

Richard Duchossois has started several traditions run in relation to the race. The first is right after the race is run, Mr. D. will pass out dozens of flutes of champagne and toast the winners just before watching the replay on the jumbotron. Then the trophies are passed out by Chairman Emeritus of Arlington Park Richard Duchossois and then interviews and commentaries are made. 

Even though Richard Duchossois merged Arlington Park with Churchill Downs Inc. several years ago, everyone still thinks of the local oval as Mr. D's place. And indeed, he patrols the facility often and is always a presence in the paddock for big events such as the International Festival of Racing, the annual celebration of racing on turf which features the Grade I Arlington Million. One can count on the festival to lure top horses from throughout the world.

Blanket of flowers 
Like most signature races, the Arlington Million has its version of a garland of flowers that is draped over withers of the winning horse. This blanket is unlike most prestigious grade one races because it does not have just one type of flower. The Kentucky Derby has roses, the Preakness Stakes has the black-eyed Susans, the Belmont Stakes has white carnations, the Breeders' Cup has Chrysanthemums. The Arlington Million calls their blanket their "Million Dollar Flowers." It has a Magnolia backing that is topped with a red and white peppermint striped broad-brimmed blanket.

References

Horse racing awards
American horse racing trophies
Arlington Park
Horse racing in Illinois
Silver objects